Richard Southgate may refer to:

 Richard Southgate (politician) (1774–1857), American attorney and politician
 Richard Southgate (priest) (1729–1795), English clergyman and numismatist